Robert "Rob" Fagan (born 29 July 1976) is a Canadian snowboarder.

He competed at the 2010 Winter Olympics in Vancouver in the men's snowboard cross competition on 15 February 2010 where he finished in fifth place.

While the general impression of the typical snowboard cross athlete is "outgoing, loud, risk taking" Robert Fagan is what to call an exception to the rule as Canada's national team rider is more the quiet athlete concentrating on himself and his sport – and this for quite a while now.

Born in 1976 in Cranbrook, Robert had his first contact with snowboarding in the age of three – thanks to a few friends – and quickly found out that this will be his passion ever since; a passion which took over centre stage in his life, a passion on which he put his main focus on, dedicating everything to the sport.

For more than 25 years now, he is on the ride of his life hoping to achieve his main goal of bringing home an Olympic medal in 2010.

Although he has not celebrated a major win yet, never placed first on the World Cup podium in 45 starts until the Vancouver Winter Games, Rob, who finished as runner-up in three snowboard cross races on the highest level so far, stepped it up big times over the past years.

In a sport where the world's elite is wide and almost everyone can beat the whole field, the Squamish resident learned how to consistently ride into the semi finals and also to take advantage of his skills in the time trials which are so important for the running order to choose the lines in the heats of four.

And although he failed a few times when it would have been important to nail it down – especially his crash on the second to last jump in the Stoneham final of 2009 is still the hardest mistake to forget – the "gymaniac" built up the confidence and the shape to be one of the top bets for victory.

See also
 Mike Robertson (snowboarder)

References

External links
 
 
 
 

1976 births
Living people
Canadian male snowboarders
Olympic snowboarders of Canada
Snowboarders at the 2010 Winter Olympics
Snowboarders at the 2014 Winter Olympics
Sportspeople from Cranbrook, British Columbia